Oozhiyan is a 1994 Tamil-language action drama film directed by actor Arun Pandian's brother C. Durai Pandian. The film stars Arun Pandian and Vineetha, with Sarath Babu, Mansoor Ali Khan, Janagaraj, Mohan Natarajan, Geetha, Vijaya Chandrika and Dakshayini playing supporting roles. It was released on 4 March 1994.

Plot

The film starts with Thilakan (Arun Pandian) running away from the soldiers. According to witnesses, Thilakan tried to attack high-ranking military officers and he then fled with military weapons. Thilakan is now wanted by the army. Thilakan's superiors come to know that Thilakan ran away to find his sister reported missing. His higher officer Anakkal Raj (Sarath Babu) describes Thilakan as an honest and brave soldier, and convinces his superiors to give him the case. Afterwards, Anakkal Raj and the soldiers trace him in the forest, but he escapes thanks to Kanaka. Interrogated by Anakkal Raj, Kanaka tells him the reason behind her action.

In the past, Thilakan lived with his only sister Meena (Dakshayini) and his mother (Vijaya Chandrika) in the village Kurinji. Thilakan dreamt to become a soldier and the village belle Kanaka (Vineetha) was in love with Thilakan. In Kurinji, the villagers didn't have enough water for agriculture. They even reported to the district collector about this issue but she refused to release more water from Mettur Dam. They explained that the local MLA Govindaraj (Mansoor Ali Khan) used all the water for his cannabis plantation. The district collector (Geetha) then ordered him to release the water but Govindaraj refused. On Independence Day, the chief guest Govindaraj appeared to be in a drunken state at Meena's college. When Govindaraj tried to hoist the Indian flag, Thilakan stopped him and he let a Gandhian hoist it, which irked Govindaraj. Thilakan then joined the army. A university conferred MLA Govindaraj an honorary doctorate, at the grand function, he behaved badly towards the district collector and she slapped in front of the public. The next day, Govindaraj's henchman threw acid on the district collector's face. Meena, who was with her and witnessed the attack, ran away from the killer. Since that day, Meena is sequestered by Govindaraj and his friend Subramani (Mohan Natarajan).

Anakkal Raj finally catches Thilakan and he is imprisoned at the military camp. Thilakan manages to escape from the jail. What transpires next forms the rest of the story.

Cast

Arun Pandian as Thilakan
Vineetha as Kanaka
Sarath Babu as Anakkal Raj
Mansoor Ali Khan as Govindaraj
Janagaraj as Manickam
Mohan Natarajan as Subramani
Geetha as District collector
Vijaya Chandrika as Thilakan's mother
Dakshayini as Meena
Raghu Babu as Subramani's henchman
King Kong
Chitti as Police officer
Tirupur Ramasamy
Singamuthu
Vengal Rao as Subramani's henchman
C. Dinakaran as Govindaraj's assistant

Soundtrack

The film score and the soundtrack were composed by Manoj Saran. The soundtrack, released in 1994, features 5 tracks with lyrics written by the film director R. Aravindraj.

References

1994 films
1990s Tamil-language films
1990s action drama films
Indian action drama films